Andrew Orr may refer to:
 Andrew Orr (priest), Irish Anglican priest
 Sir Andrew Orr (stationer), Scottish wholesale stationer and Lord Provost of Glasgow
 Andrew Picken Orr, Scottish oceanographer